Ihab Al-Matbouli (born November 6, 1985 in Al-Baqah) is a Jordanian boxer who competed at the 2012 Summer Olympics. The Light heavyweight is Jordan's first Olympic boxer.

Career
At the 2011 World Amateur Boxing Championships (results) he competed in the heavyweight division (91 kg/201 lbs limit), beating two opponents but losing to Wang Xuanxuan in the third round.

At the Olympic qualifier he dropped down a weight class to light-heavyweight (81 kg limit), beat two opponents to qualify, then lost to Sumit Sangwan. At the Games proper (results) he defeated Nigeria's Lukman Lawal but was outclassed by world champion Julio César la Cruz 8-25.

References

External links
AIBA Bio

Living people
Light-heavyweight boxers
Boxers at the 2012 Summer Olympics
Jordanian male boxers
Olympic boxers of Jordan
Asian Games medalists in boxing
Boxers at the 2014 Asian Games
1985 births
Asian Games bronze medalists for Jordan
Medalists at the 2014 Asian Games
21st-century Jordanian people